The 2022 Bromley London Borough Council election took place on 5 May 2022. All 58 members of Bromley London Borough Council were elected. The elections took place alongside local elections in the other London boroughs and elections to local authorities across the United Kingdom.

In the previous election in 2018, the Conservative Party maintained its longstanding control of the council, winning 50 out of the 60 seats with the Labour Party forming the primary opposition with eight of the remaining seats. Independent candidates won the other two. The 2022 election took place under new election boundaries, which reduced the number of councillors to 58.

Background

History 

The thirty-two London boroughs were established in 1965 by the London Government Act 1963. They are the principal authorities in Greater London and have responsibilities including education, housing, planning, highways, social services, libraries, recreation, waste, environmental health and revenue collection. Some of the powers are shared with the Greater London Authority, which also manages passenger transport, police and fire.

Since its formation, Bromley has been controlled by the Conservative Party except for a period of no overall control between 1998 and 2001 which saw the council controlled by coalition between the Liberal Democrats and Labour. Local elections in the borough have seen Conservative, Labour, Liberal Democrat, UK Independence Party and independent councillors elected. In the previous election in 2018, the Conservatives maintained their longstanding majority on the council with 50 of the 60 seats up for election and 44.1% of the vote. Labour won eight with 24.3% of the vote and independent candidates won two seats with 3.0% of the vote. The Liberal Democrats received 14.3% of the vote and the Green Party received 10.3% of the vote, but neither party won any seats. The incumbent leader is the Conservative Colin Smith, who has held that position since 2017.

Council term 
One of the Conservative councillors for the Kelsey and Eden Park ward resigned in October 2018 because he had to move due to work relocation. The November by-election was held for the party by the Conservative candidate Christine Harris. One of the Labour councillors for Crystal Palace ward, Marina Ahmad, resigned in 2021 to seek election as a member of the London Assembly for the Lambeth and Southwark constituency. A by-election was held on 5 May, the same date as the 2021 London mayoral election and London Assembly election. The seat was held for the Labour Party by Ryan Thomson.

Along with most other London boroughs, Bromley was subject to a boundary review ahead of the 2022 election. The Local Government Boundary Commission for England concluded that the council should have 58 seats, a reduction of two, and produced new election boundaries following a period of consultation. The new boundaries consist of one single-member ward, six two-member wards and fifteen three-member wards.

Electoral process 
Bromley, like the other London borough councils, elects all of its councillors at once every four years. The previous election took place in 2018. The election took place by multi-member first-past-the-post voting, with each ward being represented by one, two or three councillors. Electors had as many votes as there are councillors to be elected in their ward, with the top two or three being elected.

All registered electors (British, Irish, Commonwealth and European Union citizens) living in London aged 18 or over were entitled to vote in the election. People who lived at two addresses in different councils, such as university students with different term-time and holiday addresses, were entitled to be registered for and vote in elections in both local authorities. Voting in-person at polling stations took place from 7:00 to 22:00 on election day, and voters were able to apply for postal votes or proxy votes in advance of the election.

Previous council composition

Results summary

Ward Results 
Statements of persons nominated were published on 6 April 2022. Incumbent councillors are marked with an asterisk (*).

Beckenham Town and Copers Cope

Bickley & Sundridge

Biggin Hill

Bromley Common and Holwood

Bromley Town

Chelsfield

Chislehurst

Clock House

Crystal Palace and Anerley

Darwin

Farnborough and Crofton

Hayes and Coney Hall

Kelsey and Eden Park

Mottingham

Orpington

Penge and Cator

Petts Wood and Knoll

Plaistow 
Gary Stevens was a sitting councillor for Cray Valley West.

Shortlands and Park Langley

St Mary Cray 

On 2 January 2023, it was reported that Cllr Slator suggested that an alleged rape victim was 'likely' a prostitute and that an investigation into his comments was taking place by Bromley Council.
As of 5 January, Slator sits as an independent member of the council.

St Paul's Cray

West Wickham

References 

Council elections in the London Borough of Bromley
Bromley